Paramount is a city in Los Angeles County, California, United States.  According to the 2010 census, the city had a total population of 54,098, down from 55,266 at the 2000 census.  Paramount is part of the Greater Los Angeles Area and is bordered by Compton and Lynwood to the west, South Gate and Downey to the north, Bellflower to the east and south, and Long Beach to the south.

Geography

History

The city today known as Paramount was originally identified in 1781 by Mexican settlers of New Spain. It was organized under two old Spanish Ranchos; on the west, Rancho San Pedro, and on the east, Rancho Los Nietos (now portions of the cities of Santa Fe Springs and Whittier). These ranchos were established under the Spanish Empire and granted by King Carlos III in 1784. In 1834, Rancho Los Nietos was partitioned into five smaller ranchos including Rancho Los Cerritos and Rancho Los Alamitos, which both encompassed parts of Paramount.

After the Mexican–American War California was ceded to the United States. The then-unincorporated community of Paramount was created in 1948 when the United States Postmaster General ordered the merger of the post offices of Hynes and Clearwater (Pitt 1997:381). The name was taken from Paramount Boulevard, the main north-to-south surface street extending through the city. The city officially incorporated January 30, 1957 following a successful "Save Paramount for Paramount" campaign to fight annexation by Long Beach, Bellflower, and South Gate.

While the Paramount economy was based largely on the hay and dairy industries, the high cost of land led to their local demise. The last Paramount dairy closed in 1977.

Demographics

2010
At the 2010 census Paramount had a population of 54,098. The racial makeup of Paramount was 22,988 (42.5%) White (5.6% Non-Hispanic White), 6,334 (11.7%) African American, 440 (0.8%) Native American, 1,629 (3.0%) Asian, 419 (0.8%) Pacific Islander, 20,023 (37.0%) from other races, and 2,265 (4.2%) from two or more races. Hispanic or Latino of any race were 42,547 persons (78.6%).

The census reported that 53,788 people (99.4% of the population) lived in households, 27 (0%) lived in non-institutionalized group quarters, and 283 (0.5%) were institutionalized.

There were 13,881 households, 7,999 (57.6%) had children under the age of 18 living in them, 6,919 (49.8%) were opposite-sex married couples living together, 3,104 (22.4%) had a female householder with no husband present, 1,328 (9.6%) had a male householder with no wife present.  There were 1,153 (8.3%) unmarried opposite-sex partnerships, and 105 (0.8%) same-sex married couples or partnerships. 1,904 households (13.7%) were one person and 558 (4.0%) had someone living alone who was 65 or older. The average household size was 3.87.  There were 11,351 families (81.8% of households); the average family size was 4.22.

The age distribution was 17,630 people (32.6%) under the age of 18, 6,360 people (11.8%) aged 18 to 24, 16,271 people (30.1%) aged 25 to 44, 10,421 people (19.3%) aged 45 to 64, and 3,416 people (6.3%) who were 65 or older.  The median age was 28.6 years. For every 100 females, there were 94.7 males.  For every 100 females age 18 and over, there were 91.9 males.

There were 14,571 housing units at an average density of 3,010.5 per square mile, of the occupied units 6,024 (43.4%) were owner-occupied and 7,857 (56.6%) were rented. The homeowner vacancy rate was 1.8%; the rental vacancy rate was 4.8%.  23,759 people (43.9% of the population) lived in owner-occupied housing units and 30,029 people (55.5%) lived in rental housing units.

According to the 2010 United States Census, Paramount had a median household income of $44,934, with 22.1% of the population living below the federal poverty line.

2000
At the 2000 census there were 55,266 people in 13,972 households, including 11,331 families, in the city. The population density was 11,678.3 inhabitants per square mile (4,511.3/km). The racial makeup of the city was 34.70% White, 13.59% African American, 1.06% Native American, 3.35% Asian, 0.84% Pacific Islander, 41.69% from other races, and 4.78% from two or more races. Hispanic or Latino of any race were 72.28%.

Of the 13,972 households 55.1% had children under the age of 18 living with them, 51.3% were married couples living together, 21.7% had a female householder with no husband present, and 18.9% were non-families. 14.6% of households were one person and 4.6% were one person aged 65 or older.  The average household size was 3.93 and the average family size was 4.31.

The age distribution was 36.9% under the age of 18, 12.0% from 18 to 24, 31.9% from 25 to 44, 14.0% from 45 to 64, and 5.2% 65 or older.  The median age was 26 years. For every 100 females, there were 96.3 males.  For every 100 females age 18 and over, there were 93.3 males.

The median household income was $36,749 and the median family income  was $37,276. Males had a median income of $27,730 versus $22,472 for females. The per capita income for the city was $11,487.  About 19.1% of families and 21.9% of the population were below the poverty line, including 27.5% of those under age 18 and 10.5% of those age 65 or over.

Government and infrastructure

Public services
The Los Angeles County Sheriff's Department operates the Lakewood Station in Lakewood, serving Paramount. The department operates the Paramount Substation within Paramount.

The Los Angeles County Department of Health Services operates the South Health Center in Watts, Los Angeles, serving Paramount.

The United States Postal Service Paramount Beach Post Office is located at 7200 Somerset Boulevard.

State and federal representation

Culture

Paramount has a large community of Mexicans originally from the state of Sinaloa reflected in the many restaurants selling Mexican food "estilo sinaloense" meaning "Sinaloan style." The city has been described as a "second Sinaloa."

Transportation

The Century Freeway (Interstate 105) passes east–west through the northern portion of Paramount, the Long Beach Freeway (Interstate 710) follows north–south along the city's western border, and the Artesia Freeway (State Route 91) runs east–west less than a one-half-mile from the southern Paramount city limits.

Paramount is served by bus service from Los Angeles County Metropolitan Transportation Authority (MTA) and Long Beach Transit. The city also operates Easy Rider Shuttle , a fixed-route local bus.

Education

The Paramount Unified School District includes schools in Paramount, as well as a few in surrounding cities.

The schools located within Paramount are Paramount High School-senior and west campus, Alondra, Lincoln, Wirtz, Jefferson, Mokler, Zamboni, Los Cerritos, Gaines, Jackson, Hollydale, Tanner, Roosevelt, and Paramount Park.  Schools that are run by the Paramount Unified School District, but are located in Lakewood include Buena Vista Continuation High School and Lakewood School.  Collins school is also run by PUSD but is located in Long Beach.

Our Lady of the Rosary Private Catholic School is one of several private schools located in Paramount.

Libraries
The County of Los Angeles Public Library operates the Paramount Library.

Sites and attractions

The Paramount Hay Tree is a California State Historical Landmark. It is a still standing mature camphor tree remembered for its importance to the hay trading marketplace of the towns of Hynes and Clearwater, which later incorporated as Paramount. The hay traders met under the tree each working day to discuss the price of hay. Their numbers were quoted by the New York mercantile markets as the global hay standard.

Paramount is also home of the Zamboni Company. Frank Joseph Zamboni Jr. is the inventor of the ice resurfacing machine. Zamboni & Co. began and is still headquartered in Paramount. Zamboni manufactures and sells the machines worldwide. Since 1939 the Zamboni family has also operated Iceland, an ice skating rink with improvements patented by Frank Zamboni.

The city also gives is name to a packaging firm called Paramount Global, which was founded here in 1976.

References

External links

 
Cities in Los Angeles County, California
Gateway Cities
Incorporated cities and towns in California
1957 establishments in California
Populated places established in 1957